Emily Anne Peachey is an American actress. She had a supporting role in the film The Fault in Our Stars (2014).

Early life 
Peachey was born in Arlington County, Virginia. She attended Lake Braddock Secondary School and graduated in 2009. She is presently a senior at Duquesne University in Pittsburgh, Pennsylvania, where she studies Marketing Communications.

Movies 
Abduction (2011), He's Just Not That Into You (2009), and Step Up (2006). She played Monica in the film adaptation of  The Fault in Our Stars, alongside Shailene Woodley, Ansel Elgort and Willem Dafoe.

References

External links 
 

Living people
American film actresses
Duquesne University alumni
People from Arlington County, Virginia
Actresses from Virginia
21st-century American actresses
Year of birth missing (living people)